Nate Fox (April 14, 1977 – December 22, 2014) was an American professional basketball player.

Fox played college basketball for the University of Maine Black Bears, averaging 17.5 points and 7.5 rebounds in his senior year.

After graduating, he played in Europe. From 2000 until 2002 he played in Portugal before signing with Bayer Giants Leverkusen in Germany. For the next two seasons Fox played in Israel, Belgium and The Netherlands. In 2005, he returned to Bayer Giants Leverkusen and became one of the best players in Basketball Bundesliga and a leader at his team. In March 2008 he received a worldwide suspension for seven and a half months after a positive doping test and was fired from Leverkusen. After the suspension ended Fox signed with BC Kalev/Cramo. Fox was one of the best players in the Baltic League and he received the Baltic Basketball League MVP of the Month award in December 2008. For the 2009–10 season Fox moved back to Bundesliga basketball, playing for the New Yorker Phantoms Braunschweig. In February 2011 he signed with French club STB Le Havre.

Death 

Fox was shot to death shortly after 9:30 p.m on December 22, 2014 in the driveway of his Bloomingdale, Illinois home. The shooter was Hinsdale, Illinois businessman Jeffrey Wayne Keller, who was convicted on May 26, 2017 of first-degree murder for the killing.

Achievements 

 2008–09 Estonian Cup (BC Kalev/Cramo)
 2008–09 Estonian League (BC Kalev/Cramo)
 2011–12 Belgian Cup (Okapi Aalstar)

References 

1977 births
2014 deaths
American expatriate basketball people in Belgium
American expatriate basketball people in Estonia
American expatriate basketball people in France
American expatriate basketball people in Germany
American expatriate basketball people in Israel
American expatriate basketball people in Portugal
American expatriate basketball people in Spain
American expatriate basketball people in the Netherlands
Basketball Löwen Braunschweig players
Basketball players from Illinois
BC Kalev/Cramo players
Boston College Eagles men's basketball players
Donar (basketball club) players
Korvpalli Meistriliiga players
Maine Black Bears men's basketball players
People from Plainfield, Illinois
Power forwards (basketball)
STB Le Havre players
People from Bloomingdale, Illinois
American men's basketball players